Magaguadavic Lake (meaning "lake of eels" in Mi'kmaq) [pronounced: mack-a-dave-ick] is a lake in south-western New Brunswick, Canada. It lies primarily in Prince William Parish, but small parts of it extend into neighbouring Dumfries Parish and McAdam Parish, all in York County. The lake is home to smallmouth bass and landlocked salmon, and the warmer months see many fishermen, boaters, swimmers and vacationers throughout. Although not as massive as Grand Lake or Oromocto Lake, it is still one of the largest bodies of fresh water in New Brunswick. Part of the lake is known as "second lake" (also called "Little Magaguadavic" or "Little Mack"); this small inflow is connected via a winding, marshy channel called the thoroughfare. The larger of the "two" lakes is more commonly referred to as "Magaguadavic Lake" among residents and locals. There are many beaches and islands on both lakes.

See also
List of lakes of New Brunswick

Maguadavic
Landforms of York County, New Brunswick